The 2001 FIBA SuproLeague Final Four was the concluding tournament of the 2000–01 FIBA SuproLeague. It was the last Final Four tournament that was organized by FIBA Europe.

Bracket

Semifinals

Maccabi Tel Aviv – CSKA Moscow

Panathinaikos – Efes Pilsen

Third-place game

Efes Pilsen – CSKA Moscow

Final

Maccabi Tel Aviv – Panathinaikos

Awards

FIBA SuproLeague Final Four MVP 
  Ariel McDonald ( Maccabi Tel Aviv)

FIBA SuproLeague Finals Top Scorer 
  Dejan Bodiroga ( Panathinaikos)

FIBA SuproLeague All-Final Four Team

References

External links 
 SuproLeague website

2000–01 FIBA SuproLeague
2001
Basketball in Paris
International basketball competitions hosted by France
2000–01 in French basketball
2000–01 in Israeli basketball
2000–01 in Greek basketball
2000–01 in Turkish basketball
2000–01 in Russian basketball
May 2001 sports events in France